The 1980 Masters (also known as the 1980 Volvo Masters for sponsorship reasons) was a men's tennis tournament played on indoor carpet courts and held at the Madison Square Garden, in New York City, New York, United States from January 14 through January 18, 1981.  It was the year-end championship of the 1980 Volvo Grand Prix tour. First-seeded Björn Borg won the singles title and earned $100,000 first-prize money.

Finals

Singles

 Björn Borg defeated  Ivan Lendl, 6–4, 6–2, 6–2.

Doubles

 Peter Fleming /  John McEnroe defeated  Peter McNamara /  Paul McNamee 6–4, 6–3.

Prize money

References

 
Tennis tournaments in the United States